UK Visas and Immigration (UKVI) is a division of the Home Office responsible for the United Kingdom's visa system. It was formed in 2013 from the section of the UK Border Agency that had administered the visa system.

History
The then Home Secretary, Theresa May, announced the abolition of the UK Border Agency on 26 March 2013, with the intention that its work would be returned to the Home Office. The agency's executive agency status was removed, and internally it was split, with one division responsible for the visa system and the other for immigration enforcement. May says UKBA had a "closed, secretive, and defensive culture" that contributed to immense backlogs. The intention of the split was to disperse cases more evenly, in a way that would provide them with "high-quality decisions". The responsible minister is the Minister of State for Immigration.

Sarah Rapson, the Registrar General for England and Wales, was appointed as interim director general of UK Visas and Immigration. Her position was made permanent on 5 March 2014. Marc Owen, former senior director of national and international operations, is the current director for visas and citizenship.

Role
UKVI operates the UK visa system, managing applications from foreign nationals seeking to visit or work in the UK, and also considers applications from businesses and educational institutions seeking to become sponsors for foreign nationals. It also considers applications from foreign nationals seeking protection or British citizenship and manages appeals of those who have been denied visas.

The UKVI's role has widened in the aftermath of Brexit. In January 2021, the UK implemented a new points-based immigration system, and EU, EEA, and Swiss citizens who resided in the UK must have applied to the EU Settlement Scheme to continue living in the UK after the Brexit transition period.

Locations 

, UKVI is spread over nine buildings across the country. The headquarters of UK Visas and Immigration is in South London in Lunar House. Other immigration offices, such as the Public Inquiry Office, are also there. 
Belfast 
Cardiff 
Croydon, London
Glasgow 
Leeds
Liverpool 
Sheffield
Solihull

See also
 National Border Targeting Centre in south Manchester
 Windrush scandal (leading to the Windrush Scheme)

References

External links

Borders of the United Kingdom
Government agencies established in 2013
Immigration services
Immigration to the United Kingdom
Organisations based in Liverpool
Right of asylum in the United Kingdom
2013 establishments in the United Kingdom
Visa policy of the United Kingdom